Armenia participated at the 2020 Summer Paralympics in Tokyo, Japan, from 24 August to 5 September 2021. This was their seventh consecutive appearance at the Summer Paralympics since 1996.

Competitors
The following is the list of number of competitors participating in the Games:

Athletics 

Men's track

See also 
 Armenia at the Paralympics
 Armenia at the 2020 Summer Olympics

External links 
 2020 Summer Paralympics website

Nations at the 2020 Summer Paralympics
2020
Summer Paralympics